The Canon EF 17–35mm 2.8 lens was a wide-angle zoom lens made by Canon Inc. It was replaced by the Canon EF 16–35mm lens.

External links

 EF17-35mm f/2.8L USM at the Canon Camera Museum
 Photozone review

Canon EF lenses